Bangladesh Kabaddi Federation is the national federation for Kabaddi and is responsible for governing the sport in Bangladesh. Chowdhury Abdullah Al Mamun, Director General of Rapid Action Battalion, is the President of Bangladesh Kabaddi Federation  and General secretary is Dhaka Range DIG of Bangladesh Police Habibur Rahman. DIG of police Mozammel Haque is the joint secretary of the current committee.

History
Bangladesh Kabaddi Federation was established in 1973 as the Bangladesh Amateur Kabadi Federation. It held the first international match against India in 1973. In 1978, it joined the Asian Amateur Kabadi Federation as a founding member. The 1990, Asian Games were the first to have Kabaddi in them. Bangladesh Kabaddi Federation organizes the National Kabadi Competition.

See also 

 Bangladesh national kabaddi team

References

Kabaddi in Bangladesh
1973 establishments in Bangladesh
Sports organizations established in 1973
Kabaddi
Organisations based in Dhaka